Oak Grove is an unincorporated community in Escambia County, Florida, United States.

Notes

Unincorporated communities in Escambia County, Florida
Unincorporated communities in Florida